The Death Squad is a 1974 American made-for-television crime drama film directed by Harry Falk and starring Robert Forster, Michelle Phillips, Claude Akins, Mark Goddard and Melvyn Douglas.

Plot
A cop goes after a group of police who have turned vigilante.

Cast
 Robert Forster as Eric Benoit
 Michelle Phillips as Joyce Kreski
 Claude Akins as Connie Brennan
 Mark Goddard as Allen Duke
 Melvyn Douglas as Captain Earl Kreski
 Dennis Patrick as The Commissioner
 George Murdock as Vern Acker
 Stephen Young as Lieutenant Andrece
 Kenneth Tobey as Hartman (as Ken Tobey)
 Bert Remsen as The Chief
 Jesse Vint as Harmon
 Janis Hansen as Dispatcher
 Nate Esformes as Pela 
 Regis Cordic as Judge
 Sidney Clute as Driver 
 Jean Byron as Commissioner's (as Jeane Bryon)
 Julie Cobb as Sharon
 Claire Brennen as Waitress Max
 Nick Dennis as Greek
 Mel Scott as Officer 
 Ian Scott as Gunman 
 Trish Mahoney as Woman
 Bubby Garion as Staley 
 Sally Frei as Girl

Reception
The Los Angeles Times says the subject matter was explored "sincerely but not well" and was hampered by "a vastly overpopulated and needlessly complicated plot." However it said it had a "sturdy, driving thriller structure and excellent telling dialogue" and "Harry Falk has directed with plenty of punch" and Forster gives "perhaps his best performance to date."

See also
 List of American films of 1974

References

External links

The Death Squad at BFI

1974 television films
1974 films
Crime television films
American drama television films
ABC Movie of the Week
Films directed by Harry Falk (director)
1970s American films